Joseph Sangval Surasarang (25 August 1935 – 10 February 2022) was a Thai Roman Catholic prelate.

Surasarang was born in Thailand and was ordained to the priesthood in 1962. He served as bishop of the Roman Catholic Diocese of Chiang Mai, Thailand, from 1987 until his resignation in 2009. He died on 10 February 2022, at the age of 84.

References

1935 births
2022 deaths
20th-century Roman Catholic bishops in Thailand
21st-century Roman Catholic bishops in Thailand